Dark Gods is a collection by T. E. D. Klein published in 1985.

Plot summary
Dark Gods is a collection of four stories, three previously published.
"Children of the Kingdom" (Dark Forces, 1980)
"Petey" (Shadows 2, 1979)
"Black Man with a Horn" (New Tales of the Cthulhu Mythos, 1980)
"Nadelman's God" (1985)

Reception
Dave Langford reviewed Dark Gods for White Dwarf #87, and stated that "the supernatural fear gets a leg-up from existing nervousness about (say) the parts of town where you wouldn't walk after dark. Low Pavement, for example, in terror-haunted Nottingham."

Reviews
Review by Stefan Dziemianowicz (1985) in Crypt of Cthulhu, #35 Hallowmas 1985
Review by Michael A. Morrison (1985) in Fantasy Review, November 1985
Review by Doc Kennedy (1985) in Rod Serling's The Twilight Zone Magazine, December 1985
Review by Robert M. Price (1986) in Crypt of Cthulhu, #42 Michaelmas 1986
Review by Don D'Ammassa (1986) in Science Fiction Chronicle, #87 December 1986
Review by Lee Montgomerie (1987) in Interzone, #20 Summer 1987

References

1985 novels